Josef Wiesehöfer (born April 5, 1951 in Wickede, North Rhine-Westphalia) is a German classical scholar and current professor of Ancient history at the Department of Classics (Institut für Klassische Altertumskunde) of the University of Kiel. He is an internationally renowned expert on the history of pre-Islamic Persia and the forms of contact between the Greek and Roman World and the Ancient Near East. His most famous publication is Ancient Persia, 550 BC to 650 AD (London - New York 2001).

References
Josef Wiesehöfer's personal page (German)

1951 births
Living people
German classical scholars
Iranologists
People from Soest (district)